The Bahlikas (Bāhlika) were the inhabitants of Bahlika (located in Bactria), mentioned  in Atharvaveda, Mahabharata, Ramayana, Puranas, Vartikka of Katyayana, Brhatsamhita, Amarkosha etc. and in the ancient Inscriptions. The other variations of Bahlika are Bahli, Balhika, Vahlika, Valhika, Bahlava, Bahlam/Bahlim, Bahlayana and Bahluva.

Geographical locations

Bahlikas or Bactria
According to the Bhuvanakosha section of the  Puranas,  Bahlika was a Janapada located in the Udichya (Uttarapatha) division.

Some hymns of Atharvaveda invoke the fever to go to the Gandharis, Mahavrsas (a tribe of Punjab), Mujavants and, further off, to the Bahlikas. Mujavant is the name of a hill (and the people) located in Hindukush/Pamir.

Atharvaveda-Parisista juxtaposes the Vedic Bahlikas with the Kambojas  (i.e. Kamboja-Bahlika--).

Besides Atharvaveda Parisista, several other ancient texts also associate the Bahlikas with the Kambojas.

Shakah.Kamboja.Bahlika.Yavanah.Paradastatha | 

Kritavarma tu sahitah KambojaivarBahlikaih |.

VanayujanParvatiyanKamboj.Aratta.Bahlikan |.

Kamboja.vishhaye jatair Bahlikaishcha hayottamaih | 

Kashmir recension of ancient Ramayana has the following reading:

Aratta.Kapisham.Balhim....

Sanskrit Acharya Kshmendra of  Kashmir has rendered the above text into his Ramayana Manjri as follows:

Aratta.Bahlika.Kamboja ... ...

Besides Kambojas, Atharvaveda-Parisista also associates the Vedic Bahlikas with the Sakas, Yavanas and Tusharas (Saka-Yavana-Tukhara-Vahlikaishcha).

The fact that Puranic evidence locates the Bahlikas in Uttarapatha and further the close association of the Bahlikas with the Kambojas as well as with Tusharas, Sakas and Yavanas in the Atharvaveda Parisista and in some other ancient sources suggests that the Bahlikas were located as a close neighbor to the Tusharas, Sakas, Yavanas and the Kambojas etc. Since the Kambojas were located in Badakshan and Pamirs, the Tusharas on the north of Pamirs and the Sakas on the river Jaxartes and beyond, the Bahlikas or Bahlams, as neighbors to these people should be placed in Bactria.

The Brahmanda Purana attests that river Chaksu (Oxus or Amu Darya) flowed through the land of Bahlavas (Bahlikas).

The Iron pillar of Delhi inscription by King Chandragupta Maurya (4 CE), also makes mention of Bahlikas as living on the west side of the Indus River (Sindhu). After crossing the seven mouths of the Indus, King Chandragupta is stated to have defeated the Bahlikas.

These above several references attest that the Bahlikas were originally located beyond the seven mouths of river Indus in the country of Bactria and the land was watered by the river Oxus. But later, a section of these people had moved from Balkh to Punjab while still others appear to have moved to south-western India as neighbors to the Saurashtras and Abhiras of Sauviras.

Bahlikas in plains of Punjab
The people having surname of Behal,Bahal,Bahl in Punjab are the direct descendant of Bahalikas.
Salya, the king of Madra referred to in the Mahabharata has been called a Bahlika Pungava i.e. foremost among the Bahlikas.

Princess Madri from the Madra Royal Family has also been referred to as Bahliki i.e. princess of Bahlika clan.

In the digvijay expedition of Pandava Arjuna, there is a reference to a people called Bahlikas whom Arjuna had to fight with. They are stated to be located on the southern side of Kashmir as neighbors to the Ursa and Sinhapura kingdoms.

A passage in Ramayana attests that on the way from Ayodhya to Kekaya, one had to pass through the country of Bahlikas, located somewhere in Punjab. This shows that ancient Bahlikas had moved to and planted a settlement in Punjab too. This is also verified from the epic Mahabharata.

This shows that there was yet another Bahlika country besides the one located in Bactria.

Dr P. E. Pargiter points out that there was also another Bahlika settlement in the plains of Punjab alongside or south of Madradesa.

Bahlikas in Saurashtra
A third settlement of the Bahlikas is attested in western India as neighbors to the Saurashtras. Ramayana refers to (Saurashtrans.bahlikan.chandrachitranstathaivacha). There is also a similar expression in the Padma Purana i.e. (Surashtransa.bahlika.ssudrabhirastathaivacha). These ancient references attest that the Bahlikas were living as neighbors to the Saurashtras and the Abhiras. According to the Puranas, a branch of this people ruled in Vindhyas.

The Baraca of the Periplus is taken to be the same as the Bahlika of the Sanskrit texts. Puranas attest that a branch of the Bahlikas ruled near Vindhyas.

Legendary Bahlika kings
According to the Puranic traditions, Dhrshta was one of the nine sons of Manu.  From him came a number of clans called Dharshtakas who were reckoned as Kshatriyas.  According to Shiva Purana the Dharshtaka princes became rulers of Bahlika.

Satapatha Brahmana knows of a king named Bahlika Pratipeya whom it calls Kauravya (=Kaurava). It has been pointed out that this Kaurava king is identical with Bahlika Pratipeya of Mahabharata.

According to Mahabharata evidence, the king of Bahlika was present at Syamantapanchaka at Kurukshetra on the occasion of a solar eclipse. Also the name 'Bahlika Desa' originates from the name of the middle son of King Pratipa of Hastinapura, Vahlika, abandoned his paternal kingdom and started living with his maternal uncle in Bahlika and inherited the kingdom from him.. Hence, being the elder to King Shantanu, Bahlika was the paternal uncle of Bhishma and pre-dates him. 

The people of Balhika had presented to Yudhishthira as a tribute ten thousand asses (donkeys), numerous blankets of woollen texture, numerous skins of the Ranku deer, clothes manufactured from jute and woven with the threads spun by insects. And they also gave thousands of other clothes possessing the colour of the lotus, soft sheep-skins by thousands, sharp and long swords and scimitars, and hatchets and fine-edged battle-axes, perfumes and gems of various kinds (2.50) 

Darada, the king of Bahlika was the incarnation of Asura Surya. At the time of his birth, the earth was cleaved because of his weight. (1.67), (2.43) 

The King of Bahlika presented to Yudhishtra a golden chariot yoked with four white Kamboja studs at the time of Rajsuya ceremony (2.53.5). 

Karna had fought with and vanquished Bahlikas along with the Kambojas of Rajpura, the Amvashthas, the Videhas, and the Gandharvas, the fierce Kiratas of the fastness of Himavat, the Utpalas, the Mekalas, the Paundras, the Kalingas, the Andhras, the Nishadas and the Trigartas (7.4.5-6).

King Bahlika had participated in the Kurukshetra War. Mahabharata calls him a mighty (mahabali) king.  Along with his son Somadatta and grandson Bhurisravas, King Bahlika had participated in the Mahabharata war with one Akshauhini (division) army of Bahlika soldiers and had sided with the Kauravas against the Pandavas.  Bahlika and his grandson Bhurisravas were amongst the eleven distinguished Generals or Senapatis of the Kaurava army appointed by Duryodhana.

Kurus-Bahlikas-Kambojas-Madras remote connection?
The Ramayana seems to localize the Uttarakurus in Bahlika country.  According to it, Ila, son of Prajapati Karddama, king of Bahli (Bahlika) country, gave up Bahli in favor of his son Sasabindu and founded the city of Pratisthana in Madhyadesa. The princes of the Aila dynasty (which is also the dynasty of Kurus) have been called Karddameya. The Karddameyas obtained their names from river Kardama in Persia and therefore, their homeland is identified with Bahlika or Bactria. This indicates that Bahlika or Bactria was the original home of the Kuru clans.

Vatsyayana in his Kamasutra records a peculiar custom prevalent among the Bahlikas i.e. several young men marry a single woman in Bahlika country and in Strirajya. It is said in the Mahabharata that the Pandava brothers (i.e. Kurus) were married to one woman, Draupadi. Since Uttarakuru of the Aitareya Brahmana is said to lie beyond  Himalaya, the Bahlika or Bactria is also beyond Hindukush (i.e. Himalayan range).

Besides the Kurus, the Madra were also originally a people living in/around Bahlika  as is suggested by  Vamsa Brahmana  of the Sama Veda which  text refers to one Madragara Shaungayani as a teacher of Aupamanyava Kamboja. Dr Zimmer as well as authors of Vedic Index postulate a possible connection between the Iranian Uttaramadras and the Kambojas. Both these people were close neighbors in the north-western part of ancient India. According to Jean Przylusky, the Bahlika (Balkh) was an Iranian settlement of the Madras who were known as Bahlika-Uttaramadras.

In Aitareya Brahmana, the Uttarakurus and Uttaramadras are stated as living beyond Himalaya (paren himvantam).

This suggests that in the remote antiquity (Vedic age), the (Iranian settlement of) the Madras was located in parts of Bahlika (Bactria)--the western parts of the Oxus country. These Madras were, in fact, the Uttaramadras of the Aitareya Brahmana (VIII/14).  However, in the 4th century BC, this Bahlika/Bactria came under Yavana/Greek political control and thus the land started to be referenced as Bahlika-Yavana in some of ancient Sanskrit texts.

Thus, the foregoing discussion suggests that the Uttarakurus, Uttaramadras and Kambojas—all were located beyond the Himalaya/Hindukush ranges. Probably, the Uttarakurus were located in the northern parts of Bahlika, the Uttaramadras were in the southern parts of it and the Kambojas (=Parama Kambojas) were to the east of Bahlika, in the Transoxiana region. The ancient Bahlika appears to have spanned a large expanse of territory. The commentator of Harsha-Carita of Bana Bhatta also defines the Kambojas as Kambojah-Bahlika-Desajah i.e. the Kambojas originated in/belonged to Bahlika. Thus, it seems likely that in the remote antiquity, the ancestors of the Uttarakurus, Uttaramadras and the Parama Kambojas were one people or otherwise were closely allied and had lived in/around Bahlika (Bactria).

Bahlikas in other references
Amarakosha makes references to the Saffron of Bahlika and Kashmira countries. Similar reference to Bahlika saffron has also been noticed in the 4th century AD Raghuvamsa play of poet Kalidasa. Raghuvamsa states that saffron got adhered to Raghu's horses which they had to shed off by rolling on the banks of Oxus before Raghu undertook to attack the forces of the Hunas and the Kambojas located on either side of Oxus.

Brihat Samhita also has references on Bahlikas and mentions them together with Cinas, Gandharas, Sulikas, Paratas, Vaisyas etc.

Kavyamimamsa of Rajshekhar (10th century AD) lists the Bahlikas with the Sakas, Tusharas, Vokanas, Hunas, Kambojas,  Pahlavas, Tangana, Turukshas, etc. and states them as the tribes located in the Uttarapatha division.

The Buddhist play Mudrarakshas of Visakhadutta as well as the Jaina works Parishishtaparvan refers to Chandragupta's alliance with Himalayan king Parvatka. The Himalyan alliance gave Chandragupta a composite army made up of the Yavanas, Kambojas, Sakas, Kiratas, Parasikas and Bahlikas as stated in the Mudra-rakashas.

Bahlikas as mlechcha kings in Kali Yuga
The Bahlikas have been equated to Mlechchas in the later Sanskrit literature. There is a distinct prophetic statement in the Mahabharata that the mlechcha kings of Sakas, Yavanas, Kambojas,  Bahlikas etc. will lead an adharmic rule in Kali Yuga. (3.188.34-36).

Bahlika horses

Bahlika horses in Mahabharata
Like Kamboja, Bahlika region was famous for its horses. They were used by kings in wars.

Vasudeva Krishna  gave Arjuna hundreds of thousands of draft horses from the country of the Balhikas as his sister, Subhadra's excellent dower. (1,223)
Shikhandin's son Kshatradeva used steeds from Balhika in the Kurukshetra war (7,23).
Bahlika breed of horses were one among the type of horses employed in Kurukshetra war.  Many steeds of the Vanayu, the hilly, the Kamboja, and the Balhika breeds, with tails and ears and eyes motionless and fixed, possessed of great speed, well-trained, and ridden by accomplished warriors armed with swords and lances, were seen (7,34).
Bhagiratha gave away a hundred thousand horses of the Balhika breed, all white of complexion, adorned with garlands of gold. (13,103).
Dhritarashtra wished to give sixteen cars made of gold, each drawn by four excellent and well-adorned steeds of uniform colour and of the Bahlika breed to Vasudeva Krishna who came to talk to him on behalf of the Pandavas (5,86).

Bahlika horses in other references
Brahmanda Purana refers to the horses from Bahlika. Similarly, Valmiki Ramayana  refers to the horses of  Bahlika, Kamboja and Vanayu countries as of excellent breed. Upamitibhavaprapanchakatha  singles out horses from Bahlika and those from Kamboja and Turuksha as the best. The Abhidhanaratnamala also mentions examples of excellent horses from Bahlika, Persia, Kamboja, Vanayu, Sindhu and the land bordering on Sindhu.

Bahlika and 'Sammoha Tantra
The Sammoha Tantra speaks of the Tantric culture of foreign countries like Bahlika, Kirata, Bhota, Cina, Mahacina, Parasika, Airaka (Iraq), Kamboja, Huna, Yavana, Gandhara and Nepal.

References

External links

Ancient history of Pakistan
Kambojas